La Boissière-École is a commune in the Yvelines department in north-central France.

Geography
The village is located in the Southern West of Yvelines. Most of the landscape is constituted of forest.
The place is separated in two. The castle and the Olympe Hériot school are in "La Basse Boissière" but most of the inhabitants live in "La Haute Boissière". La Gâtine and Mauzaize are in the west of the village centre.
Nearby villages include Adainville, Condé-sur-Vesgre, Poigny-la-Forêt, Hermeray, Mittainville, and La Hauteville.
It can be reached by the 71 road and the 80.

Economy
In the east of the village, tourists can enjoy an equestrian centre. The principal activity of the village is farming: "La Tremblay".

See also
Communes of the Yvelines department

References

Communes of Yvelines